Prairial is a   of the French Navy. She is the second ship of the class, and the second French warship named after the ninth month of the Republican Calendar. The ship was constructed by Chantiers de l'Atlantique at Saint-Nazaire, France, in 1992 and entered service in 1993. Prairial is stationed in the French Pacific territories for patrol duties.

Design and description
The s were designed in response to a demand for a cheap warship capable of operating in low threat areas and able to perform general patrol functions. As a result, the Floréal class were constructed to mercantile standards in the areas of ammunition stowage, helicopter facilities and damage control, which significantly lowered the cost of the vessels. The Floréal class were designed for  using modular construction which shortened their building times.

Due to the frigate's broad beam, the ship is equipped with fin stabilisers.

The frigate is powered by a combined diesel and diesel (CODAD) system comprising four SEMT Pielstick 6 PA6 L280 BPC diesel engines driving two shafts each turning a LIPS controllable pitch propeller. The CODAD system is rated at  The vessel is also equipped with one  bow thruster. Due to the mercantile construction design, the four diesels are all located within one machinery room for ease of maintenance. Both diesel fuel and TR5 aviation fuel is brought aboard at a single location at the stern compared to naval-constructed vessels which sport two. The ship also has three  diesel-electrical generators located just fore and aft of the machinery room.

Prairial was armed with two Exocet MM38 surface-to-surface missiles in launchers situated centrally atop the midships superstructure. However, at the end of the missile's life cycle in 2014, the launchers were removed as the French Navy did not intend to replace the capability aboard the ships. The ship also mounts one 100 mm CADAM turret with the Najir fire control system located forwards and two 20 mm modèle F2 guns situated in atop the aft superstructure. The ship is equipped with DRBV-21C (Mars) air sentry, Racal Decca RM1290 navigation and Racal Decca RM1290 landing radars along with ARBG-1A Saïgon communications intercept, CSF ARBR 16A radar intercept electronic surveillance systems and two Dagaie decoy systems. 

The frigate is equipped with a  helicopter landing pad located on the stern and a  hangar. The ship is capable of operating the embarked Eurocopter AS565 Panther up to sea state 5. However, as late as 2021, Aérospatiale Alouette III helicopters were also being embarked, notably in the Pacific region. In November 2022, the Eurocopter Dauphin N3 was earmarked to replace the Aérospatiale Alouette III on Prairial. The ship has a complement of 90 including the aircrew and officers and 24 marines with capacity for a further 13 personnel.

Construction and career 

Prairial was ordered as part of the first pair on 20 January 1989 from Chantiers de l'Atlantique for construction at their yard in Saint-Nazaire, France, and the keel was laid down on 11 September 1990. The frigate was built using modular construction methods which reduced the vessel's construction time. Prairial was launched on 16 March 1991 and commissioned into the French Navy on 20 May 1992. Following sea trials, Prairial sailed for Arsenal de Lorient, Lorient where the weapons and sensors were installed and underwent further trials.

After entering service, Prairial was assigned to the French Pacific territories, based at Tahiti. Prairial was deployed to East Timor as part of the Australian-led INTERFET peacekeeping taskforce from 16 October to 29 November 1999.

In July 2016, Prairial participated in RIMPAC 2016, a large multi-national naval exercise off the coast of Hawaii, as the only representative of the European Union.

From 27 July to 2 August 2018, the frigate took part in RIMPAC 2018. In March 2019, Prairial intercepted  of cocaine after a panga was spotted adrift off the coast of Nicaragua in international waters.

On 22 February 2021, Prairial was deployed from February to March 2021 in the East China Sea to assist in enforcing UN sanctions against North Korea. On 10 March 2021, Prairial reported suspicious illegal ship-to-ship transfers of oil, which was announced by the French Pacific Command (ALPACI).

In June 2022, Prairial sailed to Hawaii for the naval exercise RIMPAC 2022. On 17 July 2022, a helicopter from Prairial assisted in evacuating two seriously injured sailors from the Peruvian corvette  to a United States Coast Guard ship during RIMPAC 2022, after the corvette suffered a significant fire during operations. Late in the year, the frigate (with its new Dauphin helicopter embarked) undertook a 36-day deployment in the South Pacific which included exercises with the Chilean Navy and patrol of the British exclusive maritime zone around the Pitcairn Islands.

Notes

Citations

References

 
 
 

Floréal-class frigates
1991 ships